The 2009 CFL season was the 56th season of modern-day Canadian football. Officially, it was the 52nd season of the Canadian Football League. The Montreal Alouettes won the 97th Grey Cup on November 29 with a last second 28–27 win over the Saskatchewan Roughriders. The 19-week regular schedule, issued February 3, 2009, began on July 1, which was only the second time in league history that a CFL season started on Canada Day, with the first occurring in 1998. The playoffs started on November 15 and two weeks of pre-season games began on June 17.

CFL news in 2009

Arena football suspension and moves for expansion

In February unexpected news was made when an American group, led by ex-NFL receiver Oronde Gadsden, announced their intentions to pursue a franchise in the CFL.  Citing the suspension of the 2009 season of the Arena Football League and the demise of NFL Europe as a potential opportunity for growth the US market, Gadsen's group highlighted either Detroit–Windsor or Rochester, New York as possible locations for a new team.  Reaction from the CFL with respect to Gadsen's intentions was mixed, however, with league head office iterating a reluctance to return to US expansion while Montreal Alouettes owner, Robert Wetenhall, welcoming the concept of bids involving border regions (Wetenhall's Alouettes spent two years in Baltimore in the 1990s, though under American ownership; Wetenhall purchased the team after it moved to Montreal).

The mayor of Moncton, premier of New Brunswick, and league commissioner Mark Cohon met in February to negotiate a deal that would see the city host a regular season game annually over five years, beginning in the 2010 CFL season.

Rule changes
Several main rule changes were proposed for 2009 by fans at the request of CFL commissioner Mark Cohon.  The following changes were implemented:
The elimination of the option for the scored-upon team to scrimmage from its 35-yard line after field goals, which was first enacted in 1975. This was said to add excitement by preventing a team up by six points to scrimmage and take a knee three times to effectively end the game with one minute to go. Although it had good intentions, the results for this rule change was not as expected, and for the 2010 CFL season, the league reinstated the option again.
Kickoffs being from the 25-yard line rather than the 35-yard line following a safety: the average kickoff in 2008 went 60 yards downfield, while the average kickoff return was 21 yards, making the option between scrimmaging and receiving kickoffs a wash.
Removing the restriction that a quarterback must take the snap from the centre.  This effectively legalizes the wildcat offense (where a running back takes the snap) in Canadian football, which had long been legal in American football.
Video replays for coaches challenges will now ordinarily be reviewed at a command centre in the CFL's office in Toronto rather than in the video replay booth on the field. As well, if a team is successful in its two replay challenges, they will be awarded a third one.

Other rule changes considered included moving the kickoff back 10 yards for all kicks (not just following safeties), and moving the ball back during conversions.

Hall of Fame induction weekend
For only the second time in its 39-year history, the Canadian Football Hall of Fame induction weekend events did not take place in Hamilton, Ontario, the home of the museum. It took place in Winnipeg from September 24 to 26, finishing with the tribute game between the Blue Bombers and Argonauts on September 26.

Bye weeks
Byes in the two weeks preceding the Labour Day Classic games were retained, however the byes were changed so as to ensure that each pair of Labour Day Classic opponents will have equal rest as opposed to splitting the byes by division.

CFL retro

As the league approaches the 100th Grey Cup, the CFL celebrated the 1960s with all eight teams wearing retro-themed uniforms from that era at different points in the season. All teams wore their retro uniforms in Week 3. The Saskatchewan Roughriders and the Calgary Stampeders were the only teams to wear both home and away retro uniforms, while the remaining teams wore one set of uniforms. The BC Lions wore their black alternate jerseys in combination with their retro pants and helmets for a "retro look," but did not introduce new home retro jerseys.

Records and milestones
On September 19, BC Lions head coach, Wally Buono became the CFL's all-time leader in coaching victories, surpassing Don Matthews' total of 231.

Regular season
Note: GP = Games Played, W = Wins, L = Losses, T = Ties, PF = Points For, PA = Points Against, Pts = Points

''Teams in bold are currently in playoff positions.

Notes
Saskatchewan earned first place in the West due to their winning of the season series (2–0–1) against Calgary.
B.C. qualified for the playoffs in place of Winnipeg due to the "cross-over rule," as B.C. finished with more points.

Grey Cup playoffs

The Montreal Alouettes were the 2009 Grey Cup champions, defeating the Saskatchewan Roughriders, 28–27 on a field goal by Damon Duval at Calgary's McMahon Stadium on the last play of the game. It was the first Grey Cup for the Alouettes since 2002. Alouettes' runningback Avon Cobourne was named the Grey Cup Most Valuable Player, and slotback, Ben Cahoon was named the Grey Cup Most Valuable Canadian.

Playoff bracket

*-Team won in Overtime.

CFL Leaders
 CFL Passing Leaders
 CFL Rushing Leaders
 CFL Receiving Leaders

2009 CFL All-Stars

Offence
QB – Anthony Calvillo, Montreal Alouettes
RB – Avon Cobourne, Montreal Alouettes
RB – Joffrey Reynolds, Calgary Stampeders
WR – Jeremaine Copeland, Calgary Stampeders
WR – Arland Bruce III, Hamilton Tiger-Cats
WR – Kerry Watkins, Montreal Alouettes
WR – Fred Stamps, Edmonton Eskimos
OT – Ben Archibald, Calgary Stampeders
OT – Dan Goodspeed, Hamilton Tiger-Cats
OG – Gene Makowsky, Saskatchewan Roughriders
OG – Scott Flory, Montreal Alouettes
OC – Jeremy O'Day, Saskatchewan Roughriders

Defence
DT – Doug Brown, Winnipeg Blue Bombers
DT – Keron Williams, Montreal Alouettes
DE – Anwar Stewart, Montreal Alouettes
DE – John Chick, Saskatchewan Roughriders
LB – Chip Cox, Montreal Alouettes
LB – Markeith Knowlton, Hamilton Tiger-Cats
LB – Jamall Johnson, Hamilton Tiger-Cats
CB – Brandon Browner, Calgary Stampeders
CB – Jovon Johnson, Winnipeg Blue Bombers
DB – Jonathan Hefney, Winnipeg Blue Bombers
DB – Korey Banks, BC Lions
S – Barron Miles, BC Lions

Special teams
K – Damon Duval, Montreal Alouettes
P – Damon Duval, Montreal Alouettes
ST – Larry Taylor, Montreal Alouettes

2009 Western All-Stars

Western offence
QB – Darian Durant, Saskatchewan Roughriders
RB – Martell Mallett, BC Lions
RB – Joffrey Reynolds, Calgary Stampeders
WR – Jeremaine Copeland, Calgary Stampeders
SB – Weston Dressler, Saskatchewan Roughriders
SB – Geroy Simon, BC Lions
WR – Fred Stamps, Edmonton Eskimos
OT – Ben Archibald, Calgary Stampeders
OT – Calvin Armstrong, Edmonton Eskimos
OG – Gene Makowsky, Saskatchewan Roughriders
OG – Dimitri Tsoumpas, Calgary Stampeders
OC – Jeremy O'Day, Saskatchewan Roughriders

Western defence
DT – Aaron Hunt, BC Lions
DT – Dario Romero, Edmonton Eskimos
DE – Stevie Baggs, Saskatchewan Roughriders
DE – John Chick, Saskatchewan Roughriders
LB – Tad Kornegay, Saskatchewan Roughriders
LB – Sean Lucas, Saskatchewan Roughriders
LB – Anton McKenzie, BC Lions
CB – Dwight Anderson, Calgary Stampeders
CB – Brandon Browner, Calgary Stampeders
DB – Korey Banks, BC Lions
DB – Lance Frazier, Saskatchewan Roughriders
S – Barron Miles, BC Lions

Western special teams
K – Sandro DeAngelis, Calgary Stampeders
P – Burke Dales, Calgary Stampeders
ST – Jason Arakgi, BC Lions

2009 Eastern All-Stars

Eastern offence
QB – Anthony Calvillo, Montreal Alouettes
RB – Avon Cobourne, Montreal Alouettes
RB – Fred Reid, Winnipeg Blue Bombers
WR – Arland Bruce III, Hamilton Tiger-Cats
WR – Ben Cahoon, Montreal Alouettes
WR – Jamel Richardson, Montreal Alouettes
WR – Kerry Watkins, Montreal Alouettes
OT – Dan Goodspeed, Hamilton Tiger-Cats
OT – Josh Bourke, Montreal Alouettes
OG – Scott Flory, Montreal Alouettes
OG – Brendon LaBatte, Winnipeg Blue Bombers
OC – Bryan Chiu, Montreal Alouettes

Eastern defence
DT – Doug Brown, Winnipeg Blue Bombers
DT – Keron Williams, Montreal Alouettes
DE – Anwar Stewart, Montreal Alouettes
DE – John Bowman, Montreal Alouettes
LB – Chip Cox, Montreal Alouettes
LB – Markeith Knowlton, Hamilton Tiger-Cats
LB – Jamall Johnson, Hamilton Tiger-Cats
CB – Mark Estelle, Montreal Alouettes
CB – Jovon Johnson, Winnipeg Blue Bombers
DB – Jonathan Hefney, Winnipeg Blue Bombers
DB – Lenny Walls, Winnipeg Blue Bombers
S – Matthieu Proulx, Montreal Alouettes

Eastern special teams
K – Damon Duval, Montreal Alouettes
P – Damon Duval, Montreal Alouettes
ST – Larry Taylor, Montreal Alouettes

2009 CFLPA Pro Player All-Stars

Offence
QB – Anthony Calvillo, Montreal Alouettes
RB – Joffrey Reynolds, Calgary Stampeders
RB – Mathieu Bertrand, Edmonton Eskimos
WR – Maurice Mann, Edmonton Eskimos
WR – Arland Bruce III, Hamilton Tiger-Cats
WR – Kerry Watkins, Montreal Alouettes
WR – Fred Stamps, Edmonton Eskimos
OT – Ben Archibald, Calgary Stampeders
OT – Dan Goodspeed, Hamilton Tiger-Cats
OG – Dmitri Tsoumpas, Calgary Stampeders
OG – Scott Flory, Montreal Alouettes
OC – Marwan Hage, Hamilton Tiger-Cats

Defence
DT – Doug Brown, Winnipeg Blue Bombers
DT – Keron Williams, Montreal Alouettes
DE – Anwar Stewart, Montreal Alouettes
DE – John Chick, Saskatchewan Roughriders
LB – Maurice Lloyd, Edmonton Eskimos
LB – Otis Floyd, Hamilton Tiger-Cats
LB – Jamall Johnson, Hamilton Tiger-Cats
CB – Brandon Browner, Calgary Stampeders
CB – Jovon Johnson, Winnipeg Blue Bombers
DB – Jonathan Hefney, Winnipeg Blue Bombers
DB – Korey Banks, BC Lions
S – Barron Miles, BC Lions

Special teams
K – Damon Duval, Montreal Alouettes
P – Burke Dales, Calgary Stampeders
ST – Larry Taylor, Montreal Alouettes

Head coach
 Marc Trestman, Montreal Alouettes

2009 Gibson's Finest CFL Awards
CFL's Most Outstanding Player Award – Anthony Calvillo (QB), Montreal Alouettes
CFL's Most Outstanding Canadian Award – Ricky Foley (DE), BC Lions
CFL's Most Outstanding Defensive Player Award – John Chick (DE), Saskatchewan Roughriders
CFL's Most Outstanding Offensive Lineman Award – Scott Flory (OG), Montreal Alouettes
CFL's Most Outstanding Rookie Award – Martell Mallett (RB), BC Lions
John Agro Special Teams Award – Larry Taylor (WR), Montreal Alouettes
Tom Pate Memorial Award – Marwan Hage (C), Hamilton Tiger-Cats
Annis Stukus Trophy – Marc Trestman, Montreal Alouettes
Commissioner's Award – Wally Buono, Calgary Stampeders-BC Lions
Hugh Campbell Distinguished Leadership Award - Stan Schwartz, Calgary Stampeders

References

Cfl Season, 2009
Canadian Football League seasons